Torvaianica or Torvajanica is a frazione of the comune of Pomezia, in the Metropolitan City of Rome, central Italy.

Overview
According to Vergil's  Aeneid, the Trojan  hero Aeneas landed here: this event is confirmed by the excavation of the ancient Roman town of Lavinium in the neighborhood of Torvaianica. The name derives from a coastal watch tower, Torre del Vajanico, built in 1580 to defend against Barbary pirates attacks. The tower was damaged during World War II and demolished during the 1960s building speculations. The town was founded in the 1940s, after the reclamation of the Pontine Marshes; population at the time was mostly composed of fishermen.

The economy is mostly based on tourism. Torvaianica is home to the Zoomarine amusement park.

See also
Wilma Montesi

External links

Unofficial website

Frazioni of the Province of Rome
Populated places established in the 1940s